Stein Bråthen (born 26 August 1954) is a Norwegian cyclist. He was born in Oslo. He competed at the 1976 Summer Olympics in Montreal, where he placed eighth in the team time trial with the Norwegian team, which consisted of Geir Digerud, Arne Klavenes, Magne Orre and Bråthen

References

1954 births
Living people
Cyclists from Oslo
Norwegian male cyclists
Olympic cyclists of Norway
Cyclists at the 1976 Summer Olympics